Yasmin Joseph is a British-Caribbean playwright. She is best known for her debut play J'Ouvert, which premiered at the fringe venue Theatre503 in 2019, before moving to the Harold Pinter Theatre in the West End in 2021. Joseph was nominated for the Evening Standard's Most Promising Playwright Award and J'Ouvert won the James Tait Black Prize for Drama in 2020.  

Joseph grew up in the north London borough of Camden, and she studied English and drama at university. Throughout her childhood and youth, her family was actively involved in creating carnival floats and taking part in the costume parade every summer. These experiences inspired the writing of J'Ouvert. Her grandparents had come to the UK from the Caribbean islands as part of the Windrush Generation. One grandmother worked as a nurse; Joseph used this background when she was hired by The Place Theatre in Bedford to write a drama based on memoirs compiled by the Retired Caribbean Nurses Association. 

Joseph has also written for Sister Pictures, the Royal Court Theatre (as a winner of the Channel 4 Playwrights scheme), Soho Theatre and The Actors Touring Company, and Clean Break.

She is based in London.

References

21st-century British dramatists and playwrights
Year of birth missing (living people)
Living people